Shujāʿ ibn Wahb al-Asadī (Arabic: شجاع بن وهب الأسدي) (died 633 CE) was a prominent companion of Islamic prophet Muhammad in the pre-Islamic era, who participated in all the famous wars, including Badr and Uhud. Some sources also suggest that Muhammad sent him as a messenger with letters to most of the world's king kings at that time. Also, a hadith narrated by Imam al-Zuhri revealed that Shuja was the messenger of Muhammad sent to the Persian king Khosrow II. He was the one who handed over the letter sent by Muhammad to Khosrow.

Biography 
Shuja ibn Wahab's real name is Shuja and the nickname is Abu Wahab. His father name was Wahab ibn Rabi’ah. In the age of ignorance days, his descendants were contracted to the Banu Abd-Shams clan of Quraysh.

Shuja was one of those who converted to Islam in the early stages of Islam. Forced to torture the idolaters of Mecca, Shuja went to Habsha with the second group of hijratis. During their habsha stay, when there were rumours that all the inhabitants of Mecca had accepted Muhammad's loyalty, the love of the homeland drew him to Mecca, as many did. When he came to Mecca, he found that the news was completely false. After staying in Mecca for a few days, he safely migrated to Medina. After his migration to Yathrib developed his religious fraternal relationship with Hazrat Aws.

He was entrusted with the responsibility of eliminating to Banu Amir a group of Bani Hawains in the month of Rabiʽ al-Awwal in 8th Hijri, which is known as Expedition of Shuja ibn Wahb al-Asadi. Bani Hawains had placed the tent at Rassi, five days away from Medina. Shuja suddenly arrived one day, hiding during the day with twenty-four brave mujahideens, and travelling in the evening. They defeated the enemy forces and snatched a large number of camels, sheep and goats and brought them to Medina. The quantity of loot's goods can be estimated by the fact that fifteen camels fell on each mujahid's share, among other things.

After his return from Hudaybiyyah, Muhammad sent him as a messenger with letters to most of the king's kings in the world. Muhammad sent Shuja with a letter to Harith ibn Abi Shamir al-Gassani. Harith was the ruler of the 'al-Ghutah' place near Damascus. The first few sentences of the letter Muhammad wrote to him are as follows:

Although, Hares refused his Daw'ah. However, his daughter-in-law Murai converted to Islam and secretly offered salutations to Muhammad through Shuja.

During the caliphate of Abu Bakr, the first caliph of Islam, Shuja was martyred in the Battle of Yamama against the hypocrite Prophet Musaylimah. He was a little over forty years old at the time of his death.

Sources 

Sahabah who participated in the battle of Uhud
Sahabah who participated in the battle of Badr
633 deaths
People from the Rashidun Caliphate